The 166th Rifle Division was an infantry division of the Soviet Union's Red Army that fought in World War II, formed twice. The division's first formation was formed in 1939 and wiped out in the Vyazma Pocket in October 1941. In January 1942, the division reformed. It fought in the Battle of Demyansk, the Battle of Kursk, Belgorod-Khar'kov Offensive Operation, Vitebsk–Orsha Offensive, Polotsk Offensive, Šiauliai Offensive, Riga Offensive  and the Battle of Memel. It was awarded the Order of the Red Banner.

History

First formation 
The 166th Rifle Division was formed at Tomsk in September 1939. It was commanded by Colonel Alexey Holzinev. On 22 June 1941, the division was in its summer quarters south of Yurga. The division hastily moved to Tomsk and was reequipped with new uniforms, weapons and ammunition. On 26 June, the first train of the division left for Smolensk. The division became part of the 24th Army and by mid-July was defending the Bely-Dorogobuzh-Yelnya area. On 19 July, two battalions of the 517th Rifle Regiment and the 499th Artillery Regiment engaged in battle with German troops at Lake Shchuchye. Days later, Soviet troops began counterattacks in the Smolensk area. The division was initially part of Group Khomenko but was transferred to Group Kalinin on 22 July. Along with the 91st Rifle Division, the 166th was to attack towards Dukhovshchina. On 24 July, it reached Lelimovo but was forced to withdraw to the area between Pakikino and Pochinok.

The division continued to attack and in early August captured Gutarovo, only 32 kilometers from Yartsevo.On 11 August, the 517th and 735th Rifle Regiments broke through German defences and provided a corridor for Ivan Boldin's group to escape from its encirclement. Colonel Mikhail Dodonov became the division commander on 31 August. In late September, the depleted division was moved to the second echelon to receive replacements. On 2 October, the German troops began Operation Typhoon and the division was forced to take up positions at Kholm-Zhirkovsky. On 4 October, Western Front decided to withdraw from the Gzhatsk defensive line, but the division could not retreat. On 7 October, the division was encircled in the Vyazma Pocket.  Only 517 soldiers from the division escaped from the encirclement. A number of soldiers from the division became partisans in the area. The division was officially disbanded on 27 December 1941.

Poirer and Connor, in their Red Army Order of Battle in the Great Patriotic War, 1985, write that it was established at Tomsk prior to June 1941. Wiped out Vyazma Oct 1941.

Second formation 
The division was reformed from the 437th Rifle Division in January 1942 at Chebarkul. The division was mostly composed of soldiers from Chelyabinsk and Sverdlovsk Oblasts, Bashkortostan and Kazakhstan. It was commanded by Major General Fyodor Shchekotsky. Between 29 January and 16 February 1942, the division was transported to Lyubim.

Fought at Kursk and in Kurland. With 6th Guards Army of the Kurland Group (Leningrad Front) May 1945.

The division was stationed at Alytus. After the war, it appears to have been disbanded while serving with the 2nd Guards Rifle Corps, 6th Guards Army, Baltic Military District, in 1946.

6th Guards Army headquarters moved from Siauliai to Riga in February 1946.

Composition 
The division's first formation included the following units.
 423rd Rifle Regiment
 517th Rifle Regiment
 735th Rifle Regiment
 359th Artillery Regiment
 499th Howitzer Artillery Regiment
 205th Separate Anti-Tank Battalion
 177th Anti-Aircraft Artillery Battalion
 191st Reconnaissance Company
 231st Sapper Battalion
 195th Separate Communications Battalion
 215th Medical Battalion
 191st Separate Chemical Defence Company
 106th Motor Transport Battalion
 172nd Field Mobile Bakery
 131st Field Post Office
 251st Field Ticket Office of the State Bank
The division's second formation included the following units.
 423rd Rifle Regiment
 517th Rifle Regiment
 735th Rifle Regiment
 359th Artillery Regiment
 205th Separate Anti-Tank Battalion
 191st Reconnaissance Company
 231st Sapper Battalion
 195th Separate Communications Battalion (later 888th Separate Communications Company)
 215th Medical Battalion
 534th Separate Chemical Defence Company
 72nd Motor Transport Company
 450th Field Bakery
 915th Divisional Veterinary Hospital
 1671st Field Post Office
 1092nd Field Ticket Office of the State Bank

References

 

Infantry divisions of the Soviet Union in World War II
Military units and formations disestablished in 1946
Military units and formations established in 1939
Military units and formations awarded the Order of the Red Banner